Puli Varunne Puli is a 1985 Indian Malayalam film,  directed by Harikumar and produced by P. K. R. Pillai. The film stars Mammootty, Nedumudi Venu, Lissy and Unnimary in the lead roles. The film has musical score by Jerry Amaldev.

Cast

Mammootty as K. P. Jayaraman
Nedumudi Venu as R. Ramadasan
Lissy as Subhashini
Unnimary as Suhasini
Sukumari as Bhavaniyamma
Innocent as Tea Shop Owner
Thilakan as Kuttithanam Kurup
KPAC Lalitha as Sumathy
Bharat Gopy as Municipal Chairman
Idavela Babu as Babu
Karamana Janardanan Nair as Municipal Commissioner
 Sreenath as Nath
Kunchan as Kumar
 James as Hotel Manager
Ragini as Thulasi
Sandhya

Soundtrack

The music was composed by Jerry Amaldev and the lyrics were written by Bichu Thirumala.

References

External links
 

1985 films
1980s Malayalam-language films
Films scored by Jerry Amaldev